Karran may refer to:
 
Kampta Karran (died 2013), Guyanese sociologist and author
Peter Karran (born 1960), Manx politician

See also 
Karan, Iran (disambiguation)